Lisa Butts (born January 21, 1982 in Montrose, California) is an American rugby union player.

After playing 5 years on the U23 National Team, Lisa has played on the USA Women's National Team for 3 years. Lisa was also a 3 time All-American while at Chico State. She was also with the team when they won the national championship in 2001. She made her USA eagles debut against  in December 2007. She was a member of the Eagles 2010 Women's Rugby World Cup squad.

Butts played at the 2011 Nations Cup.

References

External links
 Lisa Butts profile

1982 births
Living people
United States women's international rugby union players
American female rugby union players
Female rugby union players
People from La Crescenta-Montrose, California
21st-century American women